In Greek mythology, Hippolochus ( Hippolokhos) was a Trojan soldier and son of Antimachus. He was the brother of Pisander, Hippomachus, and Tisiphone.

Mythology 
During the Trojan War, Hippolochus and Pisander asked Agamemnon for mercy and to be taken prisoner alive, saying that their rich father would pay a ransom for him. They were nevertheless slain by Agamemnon.Then took he (i.e. Agamemnon) Peisander and Hippolochus, staunch in fight. Sons were they of wise-hearted Antimachus, who above all others in hope to receive gold from Paris, goodly gifts, would not suffer that Helen be given back to fair-haired Menelaus. His two sons lord Agamemnon took, the twain being in one car, and together were they seeking to drive the swift horses, for the shining reins had slipped from their hands, and the two horses were running wild; but he rushed against them like a lion, the son of Atreus, and the twain made entreaty to him from the car: “Take us alive, thou son of Atreus, and accept a worthy ransom; treasures full many he stored in the palace of Antimachus, bronze and gold and iron, wrought with toil; thereof would our father grant thee ransom past counting, should he hear that we are alive at the ships of the Achaeans.” 

So with weeping the twain spake unto the king with gentle words, but all ungentle was the voice they heard: “If ye are verily the sons of wise-hearted Antimachus, who on a time in the gathering of the Trojans, when Menelaus had come on an embassage with godlike Odysseus, bade slay him then and there, neither suffer him to return to the Achaeans, now of a surety shall ye pay the price of your father's foul outrage.” 

He spake, and thrust Peisander from his chariot to the ground, smiting him with his spear upon the breast, and backward was he hurled upon the earth. But Hippolochus leapt down, and him he slew upon the ground, and shearing off his arms with the sword, and striking off his head, sent him rolling, like a round stone, amid the throng. These then he let be, but where chiefly the battalions were being driven in rout, there leapt he in, and with him other well-greaved Achaeans.

Notes

References 

 Homer, The Iliad with an English Translation by A.T. Murray, Ph.D. in two volumes. Cambridge, MA., Harvard University Press; London, William Heinemann, Ltd. 1924. . Online version at the Perseus Digital Library.
 Homer, Homeri Opera in five volumes. Oxford, Oxford University Press. 1920. . Greek text available at the Perseus Digital Library.
 Quintus Smyrnaeus, The Fall of Troy translated by Way. A. S. Loeb Classical Library Volume 19. London: William Heinemann, 1913. Online version at theio.com
 Quintus Smyrnaeus, The Fall of Troy. Arthur S. Way. London: William Heinemann; New York: G.P. Putnam's Sons. 1913. Greek text available at the Perseus Digital Library.

Trojans